GATEPAC (Grupo de Artistas y Técnicos Españoles Para la Arquitectura Contemporánea) was a group of architects assembled during the Second Spanish Republic. Its most important members were: Josep Lluís Sert, Antoni Bonet Castellana, Josep Torres Clavé, José Manuel Aizpurúa, Fernando García Mercadal and Sixte Illescas.

The group was formed in the 1930s as a Spanish branch of C.I.A.M. The Eastern (Catalan) and founding section of the group, called GATCPAC (Grup d'Arquitectes i Tècnics Catalans per al Progrés de l'Arquitectura Contemporània) was much more successful than the Central or Northern sections, and carried out government contracts during the Second Republic.  GATCPAC also published the magazine A.C., or Actividad Contemporánea, which remains an important document for the history of Modern Movement in Spain.

Most, but not all GATEPAC members fought on the Republican side during the Spanish Civil War.  Torres Clavé was killed in action.  Josep Lluís Sert went into exile in the United States, where he would teach at the Harvard Graduate School of Design.  Antoni Bonet established himself in Buenos Aires, Argentina.  Having been associated with the Second Republic, GATEPAC was taboo in Francoist Spain and reference to it was often censored until the 1950s, when their works were taken up by a new generation of Spanish modern architects like the Catalan Oriol Bohigas.

External links
«La arquitectura contemporánea en España», Cahiers d'Art, 1931, n.º 3, págs. 157-164  (in Spanish)
 «Gatepac y movimiento moderno». In Artehistoria.
 «A.C. La revista del GATEPAC (1931-1937) en el Museo Reina Sofía», Revista de Arte Logopress
 Museo Nacional Centro de Arte Reina Sofía, «A.C. La revista del GATEPAC». Pamphlet from an exhibition 29 October 2008 – 5 January 2009
 Colegio Oficial de Arquitectos de Madrid. Exposición «El GATEPAC y Fernando García Mercadal». Information and biographies in Spanish.
  «El GATPAC (Grup d'Arquitectes i Tècnics per al Progrés de l'Arquitectura Contemporània) : de l'arquitectura a la revolució» (audio). l'Arxiu de la Paraula. Ateneu Barcelonès, 2014.

Architecture in Spain
Urban planning organizations